Michelle Álvarez (born Michelle Abril Álvarez Cárdenas on August 25, 1991, in Monterrey, Nuevo León, Mexico) is a Mexican actress and singer.

Filmography

Discography

Grupo Play: Días que no vuelven
Misión S.O.S
Alegrijes y Rebujos
Código Fama
Joya Lanza Una Estrella
Como Mariposa Solista

External links

1991 births
Living people
Mexican child actresses
Mexican telenovela actresses
Mexican television actresses
Mexican film actresses
Mexican television presenters
Actresses from Monterrey
Singers from Monterrey
20th-century Mexican actresses
21st-century Mexican actresses
21st-century Mexican women singers
21st-century Mexican singers
Mexican women television presenters